The Memphis Dynasty is a team of the United States Women's Football League which began play for the 2010 season in the Women's Football Alliance.  Based in Memphis, Tennessee, home games were played at Evangelical Christian School.

For its inaugural season, the Dynasty was known as the Memphis Soul, in the season thereafter, they went without a nickname. In 2012, the team adopted the nickname "Dynasty".  After 3 seasons in the WFA, the team moved to the WSFL and continued to play as the Dynasty until the end of the 2014 season.  At the end of the 2014 season, the team decided to disband.  There were four players that played with the franchise all five years, Ashley Bembow-Scarbough, Terri Gilchrist, Jessica (JP) Plunkett, and Sharon Tatum.  The head coach, David Gilchrist, was the only coach to remain for all five seasons.

Over the five years of play, the Dynasty compiled a winning percentage of 78.7% (37–10).  The Dynasty won four division titles (2 in WFL and 2 in WSFL), two conference titles (American WSFL), and two national titles (WSFL).  Individual league year end honors were 2010 Offensive Player of the Year – WFA (Jessica "JP" Plunkett), 2012 Defensive Player of the Year – WFA (Sharon Tatum), 2013 League MVP – WSFL (GT Shuttles), 2013 Championship Game MVP – WSFL (GT Shuttles), 2013 Coach of the Year – WSFL (David Gilchrist), 2014 League MVP – WSFL (Terri Gilchrist), 2014 Championship Game MVP – WSFL (Anglica "Jelly" Wilson), and 2014 Coach of the Year – WSFL (David Gilchrist).  In addition, players received weekly honors as offensive or defensive player of the week (JP Plunkett, Sharon Tatum, Lori Conklin, Shae Blackwell, Tonya Dean).

Season-By-Season

|-
| colspan="6" align="center" | Memphis Soul (WFA)
|-
|2010 || 6 || 2 || 0 || 1st American Southern || Lost American Conference Quarterfinal (Austin)
|-
| colspan="6" align="center" | Memphis (WFA)
|-
|2011 || 8 || 2 || 0 || 1st American Southeast|| –
|-
| colspan="6" align="center" | Memphis Dynasty (WFA)
|-
|2012 || 5 || 5 || 0 || 2nd WFA American 13 || –
|-
| colspan="6" align="center" | Memphis Dynasty (WSFL)
|-
|2013 || 9 || 0 || 0 || 1st American Conference || WSFL National Champions
|-
| colspan="6" align="center" | Memphis Dynasty (WSFL)
|-
|2014 || 8 || 1 || 0 || 1st American Conference || WSFL National Champions
|-
!Totals || 37 || 10 || 0
|colspan="2"| (including playoffs)

* = Current Standing

2010

Season schedule

** = Won by forfeit

2011

Standings

Season schedule

** = Won by forfeit

2012

Season schedule

External links 
/ Memphis Dynasty Homepage
Women's Football Alliance website

Women's Football Alliance teams
Women's Spring Football League
Dynasty
American football teams established in 2010
2010 establishments in Tennessee
Women's sports in Tennessee